Sultan Muhammad Khan Golden is a Pakistani motorcar and motorcycle stuntman and jumping specialist. He introduced the sport of reverse motorcar jumping and set the world record by reverse jumping 150 feet over 15 cars..

Sultan in 1987 set the world record of jumping over 22 cars covering 249 feet distance, leaving behind USA’s jumper who then held the record for jumping 246 feet over cars. He is now planning to break the motorcar reverse distance world record of 800 km traveled in 13 hours and 48 minutes.

References

Year of birth missing (living people)
Living people
Pakistani stunt performers